The Pashishi class (パシシ) locomotives were a group of steam tender locomotives of the Chosen Government Railway (Sentetsu) with 4-6-2 wheel arrangement. The "Pashi" name came from the American naming system for steam locomotives, under which locomotives with 4-6-2 wheel arrangement were called "Pacific".

In all, Sentetsu owned 144 locomotives of all Pashi classes, of which 141 survived the war; of these, 73 went to the Korean National Railroad in South Korea and 68 to the Korean State Railway in North Korea.

Description
Based on the experiences gained through the rebuilding of the Pureshi-class engines, the Pashishi class was, together with the Mikasa and Tehoro classes developed simultaneously, the first steam locomotive designed in-house by Sentetsu. Designed specifically for Korean operational conditions and needs, it proved to be very easy to build, operate and maintain, as care was taken during the design process to maximise the interchangeability of parts between the three classes.

The Pashishi class were superheated two-cylinder locomotives intended for use on high-value passenger trains, of which a total of 82 were built for Sentetsu and for the Central China Railway by Kawasaki and Nippon Sharyō between 1927 and 1943. From their inception, the Mikasa, Pashishi and Tehoro classes were designed to use the lignite abundant in Korea, which is less efficient than the anthracite the American-built locomotives needed; as such, they all had large heating areas. The Pashishi class featured a conical boiler and a combustion chamber firebox to achieve sufficient combustion of the coal, which in turn significantly improved evaporation and maintenance of steam. The experience with these three classes induced the Japanese Government Railways to install combustion chamber fireboxes on the 9700 and D52 classes built for the JGR from 1943.

A state-of-the-art locomotive in its time, structurally it is generally an American design in its features, with the first dome being a sandbox, and the second being for steam. The firebox is located above the trailing axle. After the first four were completed, the design was modified, resulting in a slightly different appearance of the smokestack and the steam dome, and smoke deflectors were added. The tender is a four-axle type, running on two four-wheel bogies of American Bettendorf design. Four units, numbers パシシ981–パシシ984, were built in 1936 with partial streamlining, featuring a shroud on top of the boiler from the chimney to the cab, giving an appearance similar to the JNR's D51 22–23 locomotives. Further, they had a fully enclosed cab, a headlamp mounted at the centre of the smokebox door, and the idler wheels and tender wheels had roller bearings.

Chosen Government Railway パシシ (Pashishi) class
Between 1927 and 1940, Sentetsu took delivery of 72 Pashishi-class locomotives, with the first 64 built by Kawasaki, followed by a further 8 from Nippon Sharyō in 1940. They first entered service pulling the "Akatsuki" limited express, where its performance was found to be excellent, and they were quickly put to use on the highest-value passenger trains in Korea, especially on the Gyeongbu and Gyeongui Lines, such as the "Akatsuki" limited express mentioned previously, along with other express trains, and trains connecting to express trains of the South Manchuria Railway at Sinuiju/Andong.

By April 1938 twenty had been completed, numbered パシ971–パシ990. In Sentetsu's 1938 general renumbering, these became パシシ1–パシシ20, and those units built after the renumbering continued the new sequence.

Central China Railway パシシ (Pashishi) class
The Central China Railway suffered from a severe motive power shortage from its establishment in 1939. After receiving regauged JGR locomotives second-hand as an emergency measure, new locomotives were delivered in the early 1940s. Amongst these were ten Sentetsu-designed Pashishi-class locomotives built for the Central China Railway by Kawasaki in 1942 and 1943.

Postwar
After the defeat of Japan and the Liberation of Korea and of China, these locomotives were taken over by the new national railway companies of North Korea, South Korea and China. The exact division of the Korean locomotives is uncertain, but roughly equal numbers of the 72 locomotives are believed to have gone to the Korean National Railroad in the South and the Korean State Railway in the North.

Korean National Railroad 파시4 (Pasi4) class
The exact identities of the locomotives that went to the Korean National Railroad is uncertain, but they were designated 파시4 (Pasi4) class, and were used on passenger trains until the 1960s.

Korean State Railway 바시너 (Pasinŏ) class
The locomotives taken over by the Korean State Railway were initially designated 바시너 (Pasinŏ) class. The total number, their service lives and subsequent fates are unknown, but they were probably retired by the end of the 1960s.

China Railways 胜利12 (SL12) class

After the end of the Pacific War, the Pashishi-class locomotives of the Central China Railway were taken over by the Republic of China Railway, and following the subsequent establishment of the People's Republic of China, by the China Railway, which classified them ㄆㄒ12 (PX12) in 1951. In 1959 they were reclassified 胜利12 (SL12) class (胜利 = Shènglì, "victory"), and they remained in service into the 1980s. SL12 881, 883−888, and 891 were last seen working around Hangzhou in 1983−1984.

SL12 890 is preserved at the China Railway Museum in Beijing. Their renumbering seems to have not been sequential, as 890 is a 1942-built unit.

References

Locomotives of Korea
Locomotives of South Korea
Locomotives of North Korea
Standard gauge locomotives of China
Railway locomotives introduced in 1927
4-6-2 locomotives
Kawasaki locomotives
Nippon Sharyo locomotives